The Australian Continuous Plankton Recorder (AusCPR) survey is a joint project of the CSIRO  and the Australian Antarctic Division, DEWHA, to monitor plankton communities as a guide to the health of Australia's oceans.

Plankton respond rapidly to changes in the ocean environment compared to other marine animals such as fish, birds and mammals, which makes them ideal biological indicators of ecosystem change.

AusCPR was initiated in 2007 and funding has been secured initially for four years, although it is envisaged that the survey will continue well into the future.

 
The aims of the AusCPR survey are to:

 map plankton biodiversity and distribution
 develop the first long-term phytoplankton and zooplankton baseline for Australian waters
 document plankton changes in response to climate change
 provide indices for fisheries management
 detect harmful algal blooms
 validate satellite remote sensing
 initialise and test ecosystem models

The AusCPR survey uses the Continuous Plankton Recorder (CPR), a device developed by pioneering British marine biologist Sir Alister Hardy. In 1931, this device formed the basis of the ongoing CPR survey of the North Atlantic. This survey is one of the longest running marine biological surveys in the world, and many climate related changes in the plankton have been observed over the past 70 years.

The design of the CPR has remained fundamentally unchanged over time as the simple yet robust design is a key to its success as an effective plankton sampler. The key to its success as a frequent basin-scale sampler is that the device is towed behind ships of opportunity (SOOPs) unaccompanied by scientists or research staff, making it a cost-effective sampling platform. The CPR is towed at about 10 metres below the surface and for about 450 nautical miles (830 km) per ‘tow’. The plankton enters a small opening in the device and is trapped and preserved between two layers of silk mesh. In the laboratory the silk is unrolled and phytoplankton and zooplankton are counted and identified.

Data generated by the survey will be made freely available according to the  Integrated Marine Observing System (IMOS)]   data policy and will provide researchers and policy makers with environmental and climatic indicators on harmful algal blooms, eutrophication, pollution, climate change and fisheries.

The AusCPR survey will collaborate with sister surveys, the SCAR Southern Ocean Continuous Plankton Recorder Survey and the Continuous Plankton Recorder in the North Atlantic.

Notes

References 
 Reid, PC., Colebrook, JM., Matthews, JBL., Aiken, J. and Continuous Plankton Recorder Team. (2003) The continuous plankton recorder: concepts and history, from plankton indicator to undulating recorders, Progress in Oceanography, 58, 117-173.
 Richardson, AJ. (2008) In hot water - Zooplankton and climate change. ICES Journal of Marine Science, 65, 279-295.
 Richardson, AJ., Walne, AW., John, AWG., Jonas, TD., Lindley, JA., Sims, DW. and Witt, M. (2006) Using Continuous Plankton Recorder Data. Progress in Oceanography 68: 27-74 click here to download a pdf of this paper

External links 
 Australian Continuous Plankton Recorder Survey 
 Southern Ocean Continuous Plankton Recorder Survey
 Sir Alister Hardy Foundation for Ocean Science

Planktology
Geography of the Southern Ocean